Martín Cabeza de Vaca (died 1534) was a Roman Catholic prelate who served as Auxiliary Bishop of Seville (1508–1534).

Biography
Martín Cabeza de Vaca was ordained a priest in the Order of Preachers. On 28 Jan 1508, he was appointed during the papacy of Pope Julius II as Auxiliary Bishop of Seville and Titular Bishop of Marocco o Marruecos. He served as Auxiliary Bishop of Seville until his death in 1534.

References

External links and additional sources
 (for Chronology of Bishops) 
 (for Chronology of Bishops) 

16th-century Roman Catholic bishops in Spain
1534 deaths
Bishops appointed by Pope Julius II
Dominican bishops